Jean Renard (born 12 July 1932) is a Belgian boxer. He competed in the men's bantamweight event at the 1952 Summer Olympics. At the 1952 Summer Olympics, he lost to Gennady Garbuzov of the Soviet Union.

References

1932 births
Living people
Belgian male boxers
Olympic boxers of Belgium
Boxers at the 1952 Summer Olympics
Sportspeople from Liège
Bantamweight boxers